During the months of July and August 2011, a number of targeted killings in Karachi, Pakistan left hundreds of people dead. The attacks are part of an ongoing terrorist campaign of political, ethnic and religious violence that has gripped the city in its worst form in the recent years. The targeted killings of Shias in Pakistan have been described by international human rights groups as a genocide. Since 1963, the government of Pakistan estimates more than 23,000 Shias have been killed in Pakistan, however, that number is widely believed to be a vast undercount.

July
Continuous target killings in the month of July claimed the lives of over 300 people. The high death toll in July made it one of the deadliest months in almost two decades in the history of Karachi – in fighting linked to ethnic and religious tensions that plague the city.

The shooting incidents, starting from 6 July, were perpetrated by unknown gunmen and fired indiscriminately in various neighbourhoods throughout the city. In the third day alone, at least 27 people were shot dead, in what was described as one of the worst days the city was witness to since the PPP-led coalition government came into power.

During the course of the attacks, some three buses were fired upon; some shootings were conducted in Orangi Town, causing many suburban locals to vacate their homes and flee to safer areas. All of the attackers managed to escape immediately after the crime.

The President summoned a meeting of top officials to discuss the ongoing violence and find a solution. The attack was condemned by a number of people in the media. Meanwhile, the Muttahida Qaumi Movement, one of the large mainstream political parties which dominate the politics of Karachi, threatened to call a strike if the government did not do enough to combat the incident.

Karachi has seen a number of target killings, most of which are allegedly politically motivated and usually carried out against political workers affiliated with political parties. Random shooting incidents however, like these attacks, are not as frequent and raise concerns over the deteriorated security situation of the city.

August
In the month of August, 44 more people were killed in non-stop shootings. Most of the victims were members of the Muhajir community, the largest ethnic group in Karachi.

See also

 Target killings in Pakistan
Targeted Killing in International Law
Targeted Killings: Law and Morality in an Asymmetrical World
 2019 Ghotki riots
 2009 Gojra riots

References

2011 murders in Pakistan
Mass murder in 2011
Race riots in Pakistan
Spree shootings in Pakistan
Terrorist incidents in Pakistan in 2011
History of Karachi (1947–present)
Crime in Karachi
Targeted killings in Pakistan
2010s in Karachi
Religiously motivated violence in Pakistan
Terrorist incidents in Karachi
July 2011 events in Pakistan
August 2011 events in Pakistan
Deaths by firearm in Sindh